The 1996 AFC Youth Championship was held from 17 to 31 October 1996, in Seoul, South Korea. The tournament was won by for the eighth time by South Korea in the final against China PR.

Group stage

Group A

Group B

Knockout stage

Semifinal

Third-place match

Final

Winner

 South Korea, China PR, UAE, Japan qualified for 1997 FIFA World Youth Championship.

 
1996
1996
Youth
1996 in South Korean football
1996 in youth association football